Variety Is the Spice of Life (Swedish: Ombyte förnöjer) is a 1939 Swedish comedy film directed by Gustaf Molander and starring Tutta Rolf, Per Aabel and Elsa Burnett.

The film's sets were designed by Arne Åkermark. It was based on a play which was also turned into a German film Marriage in Small Doses the same year.

Synopsis
When her composer husband loses interest in her, an ordinary housewife turns into a seductive vamp to try and win back his affections.

Main cast
 Tutta Rolf as Mrs. Vera Ivanow  
 Per Aabel as Gregor Ivanow  
 Elsa Burnett as Monica Falk  
 Ernst Eklund as Uncle Ludvig  
 Anna-Lisa Baude as Maria, maid 
 Carl-Gunnar Wingård as Night Porter

References

Bibliography 
 Mariah Larsson & Anders Marklund. Swedish Film: An Introduction and Reader. Nordic Academic Press, 2010.

External links 
 

1939 films
Swedish comedy films
1939 comedy films
1930s Swedish-language films
Films directed by Gustaf Molander
Swedish black-and-white films
1930s Swedish films